The Liyang Pumped Storage Power Station is a pumped-storage hydroelectric power station  south of Liyang in Jiangsu Province, eastern China. Preliminary construction began in 2002 and major works started in May 2011. The first unit of the power station was commissioned in 2017, the power station will have an installed capacity of 1,500 MW.

As a pumped-storage scheme, the power station shifts water between an upper and a lower reservoir. During periods of low energy demand, when electricity is cheap, the power plant can pump water from the lower reservoir to the upper. When energy demand is high, water is released back down to the power station to produce electricity. The power station will contain six 250 MW reversible Francis pump-turbines which serve to both pump water and generate electricity. Of that capacity,  is active (or usable) storage for power generation. The lower reservoir will be formed adjacent to the Shahe Reservoir with a series of dikes. The power station will generation an estimated 2.007 billion kWh annually and consume 2.676 billion kWh when pumping. Although the power station will consume more energy than it will produce, it is economical because pumping occurs when electricity is cheaper.

See also

List of pumped-storage hydroelectric power stations

References

Dams in China
Hydroelectric power stations in Jiangsu
Concrete-face rock-fill dams
Pumped-storage hydroelectric power stations in China